The Tampa Bay Extreme were a USL W-League women's soccer club based out of Clearwater, Florida. The team began play in 1997 and folded after the 2002 season. In 1998, they signed Michelle Akers. Based at the 2,000-seater sports field at Countryside High School, the team colors were white and red.

Year-by-year

Head coach
 Don Tobin 2000

References

External links
Official site

Soccer clubs in Florida
Women's soccer clubs in the United States
Defunct USL W-League (1995–2015) teams
1997 establishments in Florida
2002 disestablishments in Florida
Association football clubs established in 1997
Women's sports in Florida
Clearwater, Florida